The 2019 Quebec Scotties Tournament of Hearts,  the provincial women's curling championship of Quebec, was held from January 13 to 20 at the Arèna de Grand-Mère in Grand-Mère, Quebec. The winning team, Team Lavoie, represented Quebec at the 2019 Scotties Tournament of Hearts, Canada's national women's curling championship, finishing 8th in their 8-team pool.

The event was held in conjunction with the 2019 WFG Tankard, the provincial men's curling championship.

Teams
The teams are listed as follows:

Standings

Scores

January 13
Draw 2  
Gagné 7-4 Perron
Verreault 9-8 Lavoie

January 14
Draw 4
Lavoie 7-4 Gagné  
Perron 10-9 Blais

Draw 6
Perron 10-9 Verreault  
Gagné 10-6 Blais

January 15
Draw 8
Blais 7-6 Verreault
Perron 6-5 Lavoie

Draw 10
Verreault 5-6 Gagné 
Blais 5-6 Lavoie

January 16
Draw 12
Gagné 9-7 Perron
Lavoie 7-5 Verreault

Draw 14
Gagné 8-7 Lavoie
Perron 10-5 Blais

January 17
Draw 15
Blais 8-6 Gagné 
Verreault 9-8 Perron

Draw 16
Verreault 9-4 Gagné 
Lavoie 6-5 Blais

January 18
Draw 17
Lavoie 8-3 Perron  
Verreault 6-5 Blais

Tiebreaker
Perron 5-2 Verreault

Playoffs

Semifinal
Saturday, January 19, 15:00

Final
Sunday, January 19, 9:00

References

External links
Official site

Quebec
Curling competitions in Quebec
Quebec Women's Provincial
Quebec Scotties Tournament of Hearts
Shawinigan